A prison farm (also known as a penal farm)  is a large correctional facility where penal labor convicts are forced to work on a farm legally and illegally (in the wide sense of a productive unit), usually for manual labor, largely in the open air, such as in agriculture, logging, quarrying, and mining as well as many others. All of this forced labor has been given the right from the thirteenth amendment in the United States, however other parts of the world have made penal labor illegal. The concepts of prison farm and labor camp overlap with the idea that they are forced to work. The historical equivalent on a very large scale was called a penal colony.

The agricultural goods produced by prison farms are generally used primarily to feed the prisoners themselves and other wards of the state (residents of orphanages, asylums, etc.), and secondarily, to be sold for whatever profit the state may be able to obtain.

In addition to being forced to labor directly for the government on a prison farm or in a penal colony, inmates may be forced to do farm work for private enterprises by being farmed out through the practice of convict leasing to work on private agricultural lands or related industries (fishing, lumbering, etc.). The party purchasing their labor from the government generally does so at a steep discount from the cost of free labor.

Louisiana State Penitentiary is the largest prison farm covering , and is bordered on three sides by the Mississippi River. Canada has six large prison farms that are currently closed with the possibility of being reopened.

Convict leasing 
For more information, see Convict Leasing

Convict leasing was a system of penal labor that was primarily practiced in the Southern United States, and widely involved the use of African-American men which was prominently used after the American Civil War. In this system southern states leased prisoners to large plantations and private mines or railways. This system led to the states earning a profit, while the prisoners earned no pay and faced dangerous working conditions.

The 13th Amendment to the United States Constitution, prohibited the use of slavery and involuntary servitude but explicitly exempts those who have been convicted of a crime. In response to this, the southern state legislatures implemented "Black Codes" which were laws that explicitly applied to African-Americans and subjected them to criminal prosecution for more minor offenses like breaking curfew, loitering, and not carrying proof of employment. These new laws led to more prisoners for the penal system that could all be leased by the state so that they can use their labor for profit. Widespread convict leasing ended by World War II, but the loopholes in the 13th Amendment still permit the use of prisoners to work without pay.

Other work programs
Convicts may also be leased for non-agricultural work, either directly to state entities, or to private industry. For example, prisoners may make license plates under contract to the state Department of Motor Vehicles, work in textile or other state-run factories, or may perform data processing for outside firms. Other types of work include food service or groundskeeping. These laborers are typically considered to be a part of prison industries and not prison farms.

In the United States (partial list)

Canadian Prison Farm System

In 2009, Canada shut down six of their major prison farms. Canada had used their prison farms as a way to generate revenue, as well as to give prisoners skills post-release. In 2009, the House of Commons in Canada announced that the skills that prison farms had been giving inmates were outdated, and that prison labor should focus on work related to more modern skills.

Although the Canadian prison farm system has been shut down since 2009,the debate of whether or not the farms should reopen has continued. The group called Save our Prison Farms (SOPF) has been trying to revive the prison farm concept, since they did not want to pay for farm labor. When active, the prison farms highlighted many inherent inequalities within Canadian society. For example, the incarceration rate of the indigenous "First Nations" people of Canada was ten times greater than that of non-aboriginal Canadians.

When the Prison farm Program in Canada was about to shut down in 2009, the Government of Canada gave three reasons to cut the program:

The first reason cited was how dangerous the conditions were for the people that worked on the farm.
The second reason was that they thought the program was an out of date and ineffective type of correction giving non-modern skills to inmates for their post release.
The third reason was because it was losing money.

The six prisons revenue was CA$7.5 million, while the expenses were CA$11.5 million, with a net loss to the government of about four million dollars on a useless program. Since the Canadian Prison Farm Program was found to not be effective, along with its inherent inequalities, it seemed to make sense to just shut it down altogether.

Legal framework
The 13th Amendment to the United States Constitution, which ended slavery, specifically carved out the concept of penal servitude (i.e., forced and unpaid labor as a punishment for a crime). This exemption only affected those who have been convicted of crimes, not those who were still awaiting trial.

Britain had a long history of penal servitude even before passage of the Penal Servitude Act of 1853, and routinely used convict labor to settle its conquests, either through penal colonies or by selling convicts to settlers to serve as slaves for a term of years as indentured servants.

Scope

This type of penal institution has mainly been implanted in rural regions of vast countries. For example, the following passage describes the prison system of the U.S. state of North Carolina in the early twentieth century:
"The state prison is at Raleigh, although most of the convicts are distributed upon farms owned and operated by the state. The lease system does not prevail, but the farming out of convict labor is permitted by the constitution; such labor is used chiefly for the building of railways, the convicts so employed being at all times cared for and guarded by state officials. A reformatory for white youth between the ages of seven and sixteen, under the name of the Stonewall Jackson Manual Training and Industrial School, was opened at Concord in 1909, and in March 1909 the Foulk Reformatory and Manual Training School for negro youth was provided for. Charitable and penal institutions are under the supervision of a Board of Public Charities, appointed by the governor for a period of six years, the terms of the different members expiring in different years. Private institutions for the care of the insane, idiots, feeble-minded, and inebriates may be established, but must be licensed and regulated by the state board and become legally a part of the system of public charities."

In 21st-century Illinois, several prisons continue to run farms to produce food for wards of the state, including the prisoners themselves.
"the state prison, the Providence county jail, the state workhouse and the house of correction, the state almshouse, the state hospital for the insane, the Sockanosset school for boys, and the Oaklawn school for girls, the last two being departments of the state reform school."

There are prison farms in other countries. Canada had six prison farms, where up to 800 inmates did everything from tending pigs to milking cows until they were closed in 2010 by the Conservative government.  In 2015, the Liberal government began conducting feasibility studies to determine if the program can be restarted. In 2018, the Liberal government announced plans to reopen 2 of the prison farms previously closed by the end of 2019.

In fiction
Films and television shows featuring prison farms and forced prison labor:
 I Am a Fugitive from a Chain Gang is a movie released in 1932, which depicted the degrading and inhumane treatment on chain gangs in the post–World War I era.
 Hell's Highway (1932)
 Prison Farm (1938)
 Gone with the Wind (1939) scenes of Scarlett O'Hara's leased convicts at work in her lumber mills
 Sullivan's Travels (1941)
 City Without Men (1943)
 Chain Gang (1950) starred Douglas Kennedy (actor) as a reporter working as a guard to expose corruption and brutality.
 Cool Hand Luke (1967)
 Sounder (1972)
 Papillon (1973)
 Scarecrow (1973)
 Nightmare in Badham County (1976)
 Buckstone County Prison (1978)
 They Went That-A-Way & That-A-Way (1978)
 Brubaker (1980)
 MacGyver (1988), "Jack of Spies", Season 3. Mac's friend Jack Dalton tricks him to be arrested by a corrupt police officer to be incarcerated in a prison farm that uses the inmates to work in an underground gold mine to find a stash of hidden money.
 Life (1999)
 O Brother, Where Art Thou? (2000)
 Civil Brand (2002)
 In "Les Misérables" by Victor Hugo, which has had several movie adaptations, the character Jean Valjean is part of a chain gang ("le bagne", which is usually translated as "the galleys" or "the prison hulks") as part of his punishment for stealing bread.

See also

 Care farming
 Chain gang
 Gorgona Agricultural Penal Colony
 Iwahig Prison and Penal Farm
 Old Atlanta Prison Farm
 Tom Murton
 Trusty system

References

Further reading
 Thomas, Nicki (Producer: Scott Croteau) "Prison farms facing execution." Capital News Online. Carleton University School of Journalism and Communication. March 5, 2010.
 David M. Oshinsky, "Worse Than Slavery: Parchman Farm and the Ordeal of Jim Crow Justice," On the origins of the penal farm in Mississippi and the preceding convict lease system.
 Sample, Albert.  Racehoss: Big Emma's Boy. Austin: Eakin Press, 1984.

External links

Types of farms
Prisons
Imprisonment and detention
Penal labour